Senatorial elections were held for the first time in Ivory Coast on 24 March 2018.

Electoral system
On 14 February 2018, the government of Ivory Coast ruled that the first senatorial election would be held on 24 March 2018. The government also established new rules on appointing senators, who will be elected by National Assembly members, members of municipal, autonomous districts and regional councils. Each region and autonomous district will have two elected senators. The Senate will have a total of 66 elected senators.

Campaign
The campaign was held from 19 to 22 March 2018.
With the opposition boycotting this election, it's expected it'll be widely won by the Rally of Houphouëtists for Democracy and Peace, which will present 33 lists of candidates, competing with a dozen of Independent lists of candidates.

On 13 March 2018, the Independent Electoral Commission announced 58 lists of candidates were selected for the senatorial election. These list has to be approved by the Constitutional Council.

Results

References

External links
Senate Election  Independent Electoral Commission 
List of Candidates  
Statistics by region  

Ivory
Senate
Elections in Ivory Coast
Ivory